The Purchasers of Forfeited Estates, Ireland Act 1702 was an Act of Parliament of the Parliament of England. Its long title is "An act for the relief of the Protestant purchasers of the forfeited estates in Ireland" and its citation is 1 Anne c. 26. The Act was one of a series of Penal Laws against Catholics in Ireland.

It was repealed by the Promissory Oaths Act 1871 (c.48).

External links
Full Text of Act

Acts of the Parliament of England
Property law of Ireland
1702 in law
1702 in England
1702 in Ireland
Repealed Irish legislation
Repealed English legislation